Nikola Ćesarević (Serbian Cyrillic: Никола Ћесаревић; born October 3, 1983) is a Serbian football midfielder.

He had previously played for FK Radnički Beograd.

External links
 Profile at Srbijafudbal
 Nikola Ćesarević Stats at Utakmica.rs

Living people
1983 births
Footballers from Belgrade
Serbian footballers
FK Radnički Beograd players
FK BSK Borča players
Serbian SuperLiga players
Association football midfielders